Edith Raim (born 1965) is a German historian who studies the Nazi era. She grew up in Landsberg am Lech and first became interested in the topic after watching Holocaust as a child. Being a student of Anton Posset she started under his guidance the historical reappraisal of the concentration camp complex Kaufering, a sub-camp of Dachau concentration camp. Her 1991 dissertation at Ludwig Maximilian University of Munich  was titled Die Dachauer KZ-Aussenkommandos Kaufering und Mühldorf: Rüstungsbauten und Zwangsarbeit im letzten Kriegsjahr 1944/45 and concerned the Dachau subcamps of Kaufering and Mühldorf.

Works

References

1965 births
Living people
20th-century German historians
Historians of Nazism
Ludwig Maximilian University of Munich alumni
Historians of the Holocaust in Germany
21st-century German historians